Bazin may refer to

Places
Bazin, Zanjan, a village in Iran
Gazan Bazin, Hormozgan, a village in Iran
Kingdom of Bazin, a medieval Beja polity
Bazin, Hungarian name of Pezinok, in Slovakia

Other
Bazin (surname)
Bazin (bread) common in Libya